Deborah Blum (born October 19, 1954) is an American science journalist and the director of the Knight Science Journalism program at the Massachusetts Institute of Technology. She is the author of several books, including The Poisoner's Handbook (2010) and The Poison Squad (2018), and has been a columnist for The New York Times and a blogger, via her blog titled Elemental, for Wired.

As a science writer for the Sacramento Bee, Blum wrote a series of articles examining the professional, ethical, and emotional conflicts between scientists who use animals in their research and animal rights activists who oppose that research. Titled "The Monkey Wars," the series won the 1992 Pulitzer Prize for Beat Reporting.

Early life and education
Born in Urbana, Illinois, Blum grew up in Baton Rouge, Louisiana, Bristol, England, and Athens, Georgia. She graduated from the University of Georgia, where she majored in journalism and was chief editor of the student newspaper, The Red and Black. She worked as a reporter covering police, fires, courts, and other general assignment beats for newspapers in Georgia, Florida and California before she turned to science writing. She was on the staffs of the Macon Telegraph, the St. Petersburg Times and the Fresno Bee, among other publications.

Career

Environmental journalism
After earning a master's degree in environmental journalism from the University of Wisconsin–Madison, Blum returned to the Fresno Bee, where she became an award-winning environmental reporter. She was the first to report on the incidence of severely deformed waterfowl at the Kesterson National Wildlife Refuge, where poor management of irrigation runoff had polluted the wetland with toxic levels of the element selenium. Her work for the Fresno Bee put the mid-sized paper ahead of much larger regional rivals, including the San Francisco Chronicle and the Los Angeles Times in covering this major environmental story.

Science writing and teaching
In 1984, Blum joined the staff of the Sacramento Bee, where she broadened her range, covering science  subjects. Her series "California: The Weapons Master" was awarded the 1987 Livingston Award for National Reporting. In 1992 the American Association for the Advancement of Science awarded her its AAAS-Westinghouse Award for Science Journalism, also for the "Monkey Wars" series.

Blum expanded the Pulitzer Prize-winning newspaper series into a book of the same title. Her second book, Sex on the Brain examines the biological differences between men and women. In Love at Goon Park, she explores the life and career of groundbreaking psychology researcher Harry Harlow, and in Ghost Hunters she follows a quest by 19th century psychologist-philosopher William James and colleagues to apply objective scientific methods to the study of paranormal phenomena. In The Poisoner's Handbook she explores the pioneering work of two unheralded scientists who paved the way for modern forensic detectives. This book was promoted on Point of Inquiry. She received the James T. Grady-James H. Stack Award for Interpreting Chemistry for the Public from the American Chemical Society in 2015 for this book.

Blum has written, most often about science and its interrelationship with American culture, for publications that have included The New York Times, The Wall Street Journal, The Boston Globe, Time, The Washington Post, the Los Angeles Times, Discover, Psychology Today, Rolling Stone, the Utne Reader, and Mother Jones. In 2013, she began writing "Poison Pen" which  appears as a column in The New York Times and as a blog post in the newspaper's online edition.  website. After becoming director of the Knight Science Journalism Program, she created and became publisher of a new on-line science magazine, Undark.

From 1997 until 2015, she was a professor in the School of Journalism and Mass Communication at the University of Wisconsin–Madison. In 2005 she was appointed Helen Firstbrook Franklin Professor of Journalism, an endowed faculty position within the University of Wisconsin journalism school. In July 2015, she became director of Knight Science Journalism at MIT.

A past president of the National Association of Science Writers, she has been a member of the governing board of the World Federation of Science Writers and has also served on such panels for the Council for the Advancement of Science Writing, the AAAS Committee on Public Understanding of Science and Technology,  the National Research Council's Board on Agriculture and Natural Resources, the Society for Science & the Public and a US Congress committee on science. Blum is co-editor, with Mary Knudson and Robin Marantz Henig, of the book A Field Guide for Science Writers.

Knight Science Journalism Program at MIT
Blum became director of the Knight Science Journalism Program, a fellowship program endowed by the James S. and John L. Knight Foundation to encourage "a select breed of journalist", in July 2015. The following year, she expanded on the fellowship program by launching Undark, a digital science magazine. The magazine debuted in March 2016. The magazine's founding editor-in-chief was Tom Zeller, long time environment writer for The New York Times. In July 2016, David Corcoran, former editor of Science Times at The New York Times, joined the program as a senior editor at the magazine and associate director of the program.

Personal life 
Blum is the eldest of four daughters born to entomologist Murray S. Blum and Nancy Ann Blum, an educator and writer.

Blum and her husband have two sons.

Bibliography

Books 
 The Monkey Wars (1994, Oxford University Press)
 A Field Guide for Science Writers: the official guide of the National Association of Science Writers , edited by Blum, Mary Knudson, and Robin Marantz Henig (1997; 2nd ed., 2006, Penguin Books)
 Sex on the Brain: the biological differences between men and women (1997) — a New York Times Notable Book of the Year (1998, Penguin Books)
 Love at Goon Park: Harry Harlow and the science of affection (2002) — named among the best books of 2002 by Publishers Weekly, National Public Radio and Discover magazine, finalist for Los Angeles Times 2002 Book Prize (2002, Basic Books)
 Ghost Hunters: William James and the search for scientific proof of life after death (2007, Penguin Books))
 The Poisoner's Handbook: Murder and the Birth of Forensic Medicine in Jazz Age New York (2010, Penguin Press))
 Angel Killer: A True Story of Cannibalism, Crime Fighting, and Insanity in New York City (2012, The Atavist))
 The Poison Squad: One Chemist’s Single-Minded Crusade for Food Safety at the Turn of the Twentieth Century (2018, Penguin Press))
 Tactical Guide to Science Journalism: Lessons From the Front Lines (2022, Oxford University Press))

Filmography

TV
 The Poison Squad (2020) based on Blum's book titled The Poison Squad. Documentary film produced by PBS's American Experience
 The Poisoner's Handbook (2014) adapted into a PBS documentary from Blum's book by the same title.

Awards
 2021 Distinguished Service Award from the University of Wisconsin-Madison's School of Journalism and Mass Communication.
 2018 Endocrine Society Award for Excellence in Science and Medical Journalism
2014 University of Washington-Whitewater Chancellor's Regional Literary Award for the books The Poisoner's Handbook and Love at Good Park
 2010 The Poisoner's Handbook a Finalist for the Agatha Award in Best Non-fiction
 2010 Best Adult Nonfiction award to The Poisoner's Handbook from the Society of Midland Authors
 1992 Pulitzer Prize for Beat Reporting at the Sacramento Bee for her series, "The Monkey Wars"

Reviews
 NPR review of The Poisoner's Handbook
 77Square review of Angel Killer on Madison.com
Ghost Hunters Reviews at Metacritic
 The Final Frontier, review by Dennis Drabelle in The Washington Post, July 30, 2006
 A different kind of believer, review by Michael S. Roth in Los Angeles Times, August 6, 2006
Salon.com review of 'Love at Goon Park

References

External links 

 
 
 

1954 births
Living people
21st-century American women writers
American women bloggers
American bloggers
American journalism academics
American newspaper journalists
American reporters and correspondents
American science writers
American women journalists
Environmental journalists
Jewish American journalists
Jewish American writers
Journalists from California
Writers from Madison, Wisconsin
Pulitzer Prize for Beat Reporting winners
Science bloggers
University of Georgia alumni
University of Wisconsin–Madison School of Journalism & Mass Communication alumni
Wired (magazine) people
Women science writers
Writers from Baton Rouge, Louisiana
Writers from Sacramento, California
Writers from Urbana, Illinois
21st-century American non-fiction writers
21st-century American Jews